Krasnochikoysky District is an administrative and municipal district (raion), one of the thirty-one in Zabaykalsky Krai, Russia. It is located in the southwest of the krai, and borders with Khiloksky District in the north, Ulyotovsky District in the east, and Kyrinsky District in the south. Its administrative center is the rural locality (a selo) of Krasny Chikoy. Population:  21,576 (2002 Census);  The population of Krasny Chikoy accounts for 36.3% of the district's total population.

Geography
The Khentei-Daur Highlands are located in the southern part of the district, including the Chikokon Range with Bystrinsky Golets, the highest point of the highlands.

History
The district was established in 1933.

References

Sources

Districts of Zabaykalsky Krai
States and territories established in 1933

